Angela Deuber (born 1975) is a German-born Swiss architect.

She was born in Bad Kissingen and graduated in architecture from the ETH Zurich. She set up her own office "Angela Deuber Architect" (ADA) in Chur in 2006. Deuber taught at the ETH Zurich from 2007 to 2010; in 2012, she became a lecturer at the University of Lucerne.

Her work includes a school building in Thal in St. Gallen, a cultural centre in Buochs and the conversion of a house built in the Late Middle Ages in Stuls, Grisons. She was included in an exhibition Young Swiss Public of young Swiss architects held at the Cass School of Architecture in London.

Deuber was awarded the arcVision Prize Women and architecture in 2015. The jury said "Angela Deuber is one of the youngest participants to have been nominated in this edition. In her work we have identified a new outlook for architecture; she successfully pinpoints important areas for structural research in construction and use of materials whilst encapsulating involvement and engagement of female architects in society". Angela Deuber was invited to exhibit the ADA work at the 2018 Biennale Architettura in Venice.

She is visiting professor at the Accademia di Architettura in Mendrisio, Switzerland and at the Oslo School of Architecture and Design.

External Links 

 ADA. “ANGELA DEUBER ARCHITECTS - HOME.” Accessed October 13, 2021. https://www.angeladeuber.com/.
 Seventh Edition 2019–2020. “Angela Deuber.” Swiss Architectural Award. Accessed October 13, 2021. https://swissarchitecturalaward.com/en/profiles/angela-deuber/.
 “Angela Deuber.” In A + U: Architecture and Urbanism, Vol. 580. Emerging Architects Under 45 in Switzerland. 2018. Japan: Shinkenchiku-sha, n.d. Accessed October 13, 2021.

References 

1975 births
Living people
Swiss women architects